Daniel Roy Carpenter (born November 25, 1985) is a former American football placekicker. He was signed by the Miami Dolphins as an undrafted free agent in 2008 after playing college football for the University of Montana. He has also played for the Buffalo Bills.

Early years
Carpenter attended Helena High School in Helena, Montana, where he was a member of the National Honor Society and had a 3.7 grade point average.  As a football player at Helena, Carpenter was a two-time all-state and two-time all-league selection as a kicker and punter. During his senior season, he converted 26 of 29 point after attempts and made five field goals with a long of 53 yards. Additionally, he was a first all-conference and second-team all-state selection as a wide receiver, setting school records with 931 receiving yards and 13 touchdowns.

College career
Carpenter enrolled at the University of Montana, and became the placekicker for the Montana Grizzlies football team as a true freshman in 2004. He went 18-for-29 (62.1 percent) on field-goal attempts while converting all 63 extra-point tries. Carpenter also rushed twice for 17 yards and scored a touchdown. His 123 points that season were the second-highest total in school history, and his performance earned him a second-team All-Big Sky selection.

As a sophomore in 2005, Carpenter went 14-for-21 (66.7 percent) on field-goal attempts and punted nine times for a 41.4-yard average. on the way to his second straight second-team All-Big Sky selection. His streak of 67 consecutive extra points made dating back to his freshman season was snapped in the 2005 season opener against Fort Lewis.

Carpenter earned his third straight All-Big Sky selection as a junior in 2006, receiving second-team honors as a placekicker as well as being an honorable mention as a punter. Additionally, he was named a first-team All-American by the Associated Press. On the season, he converted 24 of 30 field goals (80 percent) with four blocked and punted 62 times for a 41.9-yard average.

Carpenter had the most efficient season of his career as a senior in 2007, converting 19 of 23 field goals (82.6 percent). His performance earned him his fourth-straight All-Big Sky selection and second straight All-America selection.

In his four years at Montana, Carpenter converted on 75 of 103 field goals (72.8 percent) and punted 71 times for a 41.8-yard average. He also passed once for 14 yards, rushed twice for 17 yards and a touchdown, caught one pass for two yards and made seven solo tackles.

Statistics

Professional career

Miami Dolphins (2009–2012)

After going undrafted in the 2008 NFL Draft, Carpenter signed a two-year contract with the Miami Dolphins on April 29, 2008. The deal included a $7,500 signing bonus.

The Dolphins released 2007 starting kicker Jay Feely on August 12, 2008 (despite having set the Dolphins single-season field-goal percentage record in his only season), having already released try-out signing Dave Rayner on June 6. The decision effectively selected Carpenter to be the starting kicker for the 2008 season, with coach Tony Sparano commenting that the decision to cut Feely "was based purely on numbers, on performance, and Carpenter has outperformed him right now. That's the bottom line."

Carpenter made his professional debut on September 7, 2008 (Week 1) against the Jets, going 2/2 on PAT's (the team attempted no FG's). He kicked his first professional field goal the following week against the Cardinals, finishing the game with 1/1 FG's and 1/1 PAT's.

On November 30, 2008, Carpenter set the Dolphins' rookie record for most consecutive field goals made with 11.

Carpenter was awarded the AFC Special Teams Player of the Month for November 2008, for converting all eight of his field goal attempts during the month, including five from a distance longer than 40 yards.

According to NFL statistics, Carpenter finished the 2009 season going 25 for 28 on field goals with a long of 52 yards and also finished 40 for 40 on extra point attempts.

On October 17, 2010, against the Green Bay Packers, Carpenter kicked 3 field goals, including the 44-yard game-winning field goal with 9:01 left in overtime to give the Dolphins a 23-20 win.

On December 5, 2010, Carpenter made a 60-yard field goal in a home game against the Cleveland Browns and was the 5th longest in NFL history.

Two weeks later, on December 19, Carpenter had one of the worst statistical kicking performances in recent memory, going 0-4 on field goals against the Buffalo Bills in a loss that would end the Dolphins playoff hopes that season. All of the kicks he attempted were 48 yards or longer. A performance this bad would not be seen again until Week 5 of the 2018 NFL season when Mason Crosby went 1-6 on field goals against the Detroit Lions.

Carpenter made his first Pro Bowl in 2009. San Diego Chargers kicker Nate Kaeding did not play due to injury, and Carpenter took his spot.

At of the end of the 2010 season, Carpenter was the second most accurate kicker in NFL history, behind Kaeding.

On September 23, 2012, Carpenter missed a 47-yard field goal in a home game against the New York Jets in overtime which would have sealed victory for Miami in overtime. Carpenter also missed a field goal from a similar distance earlier in the game. Miami would ultimately go on to lose 23-20 to New York in overtime.

On November 25, 2012, his 27th birthday, he hit a 43-yard field goal to win against the Seattle Seahawks in overtime to win 24-21 at  home.

On December 22, 2012, Carpenter was placed on injured reserve.

On August 14, 2013, Carpenter was released by the Miami Dolphins. Before his release, he was battling rookie Caleb Sturgis for the Dolphins' starting placekicker job.

Arizona Cardinals (2013)
On August 21, 2013, Carpenter signed with the Arizona Cardinals. Carpenter was signed to compete for the starting placekicker job with incumbent kicker Jay Feely. On August 25, 2013, he was cut by the Cardinals.

New York Jets (2013)
Carpenter was signed by the New York Jets on August 27, 2013. He was released on August 31, 2013.

Buffalo Bills (2013–2016)

The Bills signed Carpenter on September 3, 2013 due to a groin injury sustained by starting kicker Dustin Hopkins.

On October 20, 2013 against the Miami Dolphins, Carpenter kicked three field goals, including the game-winner from 31 yards out with 33 seconds left in the game.

He re-signed with the Bills on March 11, 2014. Carpenter was named AFC Special Teams Player of the Week for the first week of the 2014 season due to his efforts against the Chicago Bears.

On September 14, 2014, against the Miami Dolphins, Carpenter converted five-of-six field goal attempts and two PATs, scoring a career-high 17 points.

In 2015, the Buffalo Bills brought in veteran placekicker, Billy Cundiff, to compete with Carpenter. After Week 5, Cundiff was released, making Carpenter their kicker for 2015.

In Week 11 of the 2016 season, Carpenter kicked three field goals including one for 54 yards in a win over the Bengals and was named AFC Special Teams Player of the Week.

On December 24, 2016, Week 16 – in overtime the Bills had a chance to go ahead on a 45-yard field goal, but Carpenter’s attempt went wide right. Three possessions later, the Dolphins got a 57-yard run down the left sideline from Jay Ajayi to set up a game-winning 27-yard field goal to lift the Dolphins over Buffalo 34–31, ending the Bills' slim playoff hopes.

On March 6, 2017, Carpenter was released by the Bills.

NFL career statistics

Personal life
Born in Omaha, Nebraska, the 3rd child of Val and Diane Carpenter, moved to Helena, Montana when he was 20 months old.  Played nearly all sports as a child and grew up as a Nebraska Cornhuskers fan. Was loved and supported by his parents and 2 sisters and a brother.    Carpenter married Kaela Clawson native of Plentywood, Montana, in a private ceremony and reception on July 2, 2011. The events were held on the acreage of the bride's family farm and ranch in Montana. Carpenter and Clawson met in college in Missoula, Montana. Clawson studied elementary education. It is also known that Dan Carpenter is Catholic. Carpenter was cut by the Dolphins in 2013 with their first child "due any moment". In 2016, Kaela controversially tweeted about her desire to have Seattle Seahawks cornerback Richard Sherman castrated following a game where Sherman landed a dirty hit on her husband.

References

External links
Miami Dolphins bio
Montana Grizzlies bio

1985 births
Living people
American football placekickers
Arizona Cardinals players
Buffalo Bills players
Miami Dolphins players
Montana Grizzlies football players
New York Jets players
Sportspeople from Helena, Montana
Players of American football from Montana
Sportspeople from Omaha, Nebraska